Murad Ramazanov (born October 16, 1995, in Khasavyurt, Dagestan) is a male freestyle wrestler who represented the Republic of Macedonia. He participated in Men's freestyle 60 kg at 2008 Summer Olympics. In this competition he participated in 4 matches and was eliminated, losing against Zelimkhan Huseynov.

External links
 Wrestler bio on beijing2008.com
 

Living people
1974 births
Olympic wrestlers of North Macedonia
Olympic wrestlers of Russia
Macedonian people of Dagestani descent
Macedonian male sport wrestlers
Wrestlers at the 2000 Summer Olympics
Russian male sport wrestlers
Wrestlers at the 2008 Summer Olympics
People from Khasavyurt
Sportspeople from Dagestan